Aelurillus is a genus of spiders in the family Salticidae (jumping spiders).

Description
Species of the genus Aelurillus are typically about 7 mm long in females, and up to five mm in males. They are stout, squat-shaped and rather furry, with females often uniformly mottled sandy brown, while males are often black, sometimes with a pattern and with light, annulated legs.

Habits

Spiders in this genus mainly catch and feed on ants (myrmecophagy).

A Southeast Asian species of the genus Aelurillus has been observed to jump around 30-40 times its body length straight onto the back of a large gnaphosid spider and kill it.

They like hot, dry, stony places or small bare open areas with dead twigs or similar amongst low vegetation.

Distribution
Species of the genus Aelurillus occur in the Palaearctic and Africa, with a few species known from India (A. improvisus, A. minimontanus) and Sri Lanka (A. kronestedti, A. quadrimaculatus). Aelurillus subfestivus is found in Japan.

Species
The following species are recognised in the genus Aelurillus:
 Aelurillus aeruginosus (Simon, 1871) – Mediterranean
 Aelurillus afghanus Azarkina, 2006 – Afghanistan
 Aelurillus alboclypeus Azarkina & Komnenov, 2015 – Turkey
 Aelurillus ambiguus (Denis, 1966) – Libya
 Aelurillus andreevae Nenilin, 1984 – Central Asia
 Aelurillus angularis Prószynski, 2000 – Israel
 Aelurillus ater (Kroneberg, 1875) – Central Asia
 Aelurillus balearus Azarkina, 2006 – Canary Islands, Balearic Islands
 Aelurillus basseleti (Lucas, 1846) – Algeria, Tunisia
 Aelurillus blandus (Simon, 1871) – Greece, Crete
 Aelurillus bokerinus Prószynski, 2003 – Israel
 Aelurillus bosmansi Azarkina, 2006 – Spain
 Aelurillus brutus Wesołowska, 1996 – Turkmenistan, Kazakhstan
 Aelurillus catherinae Prószynski, 2000 – Egypt
 Aelurillus catus Simon, 1886 – Senegal
 Aelurillus cognatus (O. P.-Cambridge, 1872) – Lebanon
 Aelurillus concolor Kulczynski, 1901 – Macedonia, Iran, Central Asia
 Aelurillus conveniens (O. P.-Cambridge, 1872) – Egypt, Israel, Syria
 Aelurillus cretensis Azarkina, 2002 – Crete
 Aelurillus cristatopalpus Simon, 1902 – South Africa
 Aelurillus cypriotus Azarkina, 2006 – Cyprus
 Aelurillus deltshevi Azarkina & Komnenov, 2015 – North Macedonia, Bulgaria, Azerbaijan
 Aelurillus desertus (Wesołowska & van Harten, 2010) – United Arab Emirates
 Aelurillus dorthesi (Audouin, 1826) – Egypt
 Aelurillus dubatolovi Azarkina, 2003 – Central Asia
 Aelurillus faragallai Prószynski, 1993 – Saudi Arabia, Yemen
 Aelurillus galinae Wesołowska & van Harten, 2010 – United Arab Emirates
 Aelurillus gershomi Prószynski, 2000 – Israel
 Aelurillus guecki Metzner, 1999 – Greece
 Aelurillus helvenacius Logunov, 1993 – Mongolia
 Aelurillus hirtipes Denis, 1960 – North Africa
 Aelurillus improvisus Azarkina, 2002 – India
 Aelurillus jerusalemicus Prószynski, 2000 – Israel
 Aelurillus khorasanicus Azarkina & Mirshamsi, 2014 – Iran
 Aelurillus kochi Roewer, 1951 – Greece, Israel, Syria
 Aelurillus kopetdaghi Wesołowska, 1996 – Turkmenistan
 Aelurillus kronestedti Azarkina, 2004 – Sri Lanka
 Aelurillus laniger Logunov & Marusik, 2000 – Macedonia, Kazakhstan
 Aelurillus latebricola Spassky, 1941 – Tajikistan
 Aelurillus leipoldae (Metzner, 1999) – Crete
 Aelurillus logunovi Azarkina, 2004 – Afghanistan, Pakistan
 Aelurillus lopadusae Cantarella, 1983 – Italy, Algeria
 Aelurillus lucasi Roewer, 1951 – Canary Islands, Salvages
 Aelurillus luctuosus (Lucas, 1846) – Mediterranean to Turkmenistan
 Aelurillus lutosus (Tyschchenko, 1965) – Kazakhstan, Kyrgyzstan
 Aelurillus marusiki Azarkina, 2002 – Iran
 Aelurillus minimontanus Azarkina, 2002 – India
 Aelurillus mirabilis Wesołowska, 2006 – Namibia
 Aelurillus m-nigrum Kulczynski, 1891 – Palearctic
 Aelurillus madagascariensis Azarkina, 2009 – Madagascar
 Aelurillus marusiki Azarkina, 2002 – Iran
 Aelurillus minimontanus Azarkina, 2002 – India
 Aelurillus minutus Azarkina, 2002 – Syria, Eritrea 
 Aelurillus mirabilis Wesołowska, 2006 Wesołowska, 2006 – Namibia
 Aelurillus monardi (Lucas, 1846) – Mediterranean
 Aelurillus murphyorum Azarkina, 2022 – Kenya 
 Aelurillus nabataeus Prószynski, 2003 – Israel
 Aelurillus nenilini Azarkina, 2002 – Turkmenistan, Uzbekistan, Kazakhstan
 Aelurillus numidicus (Lucas, 1846) – Algeria
 Aelurillus plumipes (Thorell, 1875) – Algeria, Tunisia
 Aelurillus politiventris (O. P.-Cambridge, 1872) – Greece to Israel
 Aelurillus quadrimaculatus Simon, 1889 – India, Sri Lanka
 Aelurillus rugatus (Bösenberg & Lenz, 1895) – Tanzania
 Aelurillus russellsmithi Azarkina, 2009 – Ivory Coast
 Aelurillus schembrii Cantarella, 1982 – Sicily, Malta
 Aelurillus simplex (Herman, 1879) – Hungary
 Aelurillus spinicrus (Simon, 1871) – Morocco
 Aelurillus steinmetzi Metzner, 1999 – Greece
 Aelurillus subaffinis Caporiacco, 1947 – Ethiopia
 Aelurillus subfestivus Saito, 1934 – Japan
 Aelurillus thailandicus Azarkina, 2019 – Thailand
 Aelurillus tumidulus Wesołowska & Tomasiewicz, 2008 – Ethiopia
 Aelurillus unitibialis Azarkina, 2002 – Iran
 Aelurillus v-insignitus (Clerck, 1757) – Palearctic
 Aelurillus v-insignitus morulus (Simon, 1937) – France
 Aelurillus v-insignitus obsoletus Kulczynski, 1891 – Eastern Europe
 Aelurillus westi Azarkina & Zamani, 2019 – Iran

References

 Murphy, Frances & Murphy, John (2000): An Introduction to the Spiders of South East Asia. Malaysian Nature Society, Kuala Lumpur.

Further reading
 Li, D., Jackson, R.R. & Harland, D.P (1999). Prey-capture techniques and prey preferences of Aelurillus aeruginosus, A. cognatus and A. kochi, ant-eating jumping spiders (Araneae: Salticidae) from Israel. Isr. J. Zool 45: 341-.
 Azarkina, G.N. (2004): Two new species of the genus Aelurillus Simon, 1884 from Pakistan and Sri Lanka (Araneae: Salticidae). Bulletin of the British Arachnological Society 13(2): 49-52
 Szűts, T. & Azarkina, G. (2002): Redescription of Aelurillus subaffinis Caporiacco, 1947 (Araneae: Salticidae). Annales Historico-Naturales Musei Nationalis Hungarici'' 94: 209-216. PDF

External links

Short description of Aelurillus (with drawings)
Redescription of Aelurillus subaffinis Caporiacco, 1947 (PDF)
Photographs of A. monardi
 Photograph of A. aeruginosus

Salticidae genera
Spiders of Asia
Spiders of Africa
Salticidae